Tehilim is Raphael Nadjari's fifth feature film. It was shot in Jerusalem in 2006. Tehilim in the Hebrew word for Psalms.

Plot

In contemporary Jerusalem, a small Jewish family leads an ordinary life until following a car accident, the father mysteriously disappears. They all deal with his absence and the difficulties of everyday life as best they can. While the adults take refuge in silence or traditions, the two children, Menachem and David, seek their own way to find their father.

Cast
 Michael Moshonov - Menachem
 Yonathan Alster David
 Limor Goldstein - Alma
 Shmuel Vilozni - Eli
 Ilan Dar - Shmuel
 Yoav Hait - Aharon
 Reut Lev - Deborah

Format and release
The film was shot in HD, using prime lenses. The film was released in France by Haut et Court, in Spain, Belgium and Germany and exhibited at the Museum of Modern Art in New York the following year.

Tehilim received top prize in the Tokyo Filmex. The jury conducted by Lee Chang Dong wrote the following statement : "The mysterious loss of the father of an average Israeli family brings to the fore a universal problem of today's world - the lack of orientation. It is left to the individual whether to see this as a human subject matter, an intimate story or a reflection of Israeli society today. It is told in a personal style, which - as world cinema- transgresses borders and religions.".

Awards and nominations
Cannes Film Festival (2007) - In Competition
Tokyo Filmex (2007) - Grand Prize

References

External links

2007 films
Israeli drama films
French drama films
2000s Hebrew-language films
2007 drama films
Films directed by Raphael Nadjari
Films scored by Nathaniel Méchaly
2000s French films